Apiletria marcida is a moth in the family Autostichidae. It was described by Cajetan Felder, Rudolf Felder and Alois Friedrich Rogenhofer in 1875. It is found in Australia.

The wingspan is about 20 mm. The forewings are pale yellow and the hindwings are grey.

References

Apiletria
Moths described in 1875